The Inner or Deep Part of an Animal or Plant Structure is an official DVD released by Björk on August 31, 2004. It is a 45-minute film about the making of the Medúlla album. The DVD features clips of the studio performances by Dokaka, Shlomo, Rahzel and Mike Patton that formed the beats for many of the songs on the album. It was originally issued as a bonus feature on the multichannel DVD-A of 'Medulla' and then later reissued by itself as a separate disc. 

The title of the DVD is the actual definition of the word "Medúlla".

Songs
The tracks listed below are featured either as background music or as part of the documentary:
"Oceania" (Choral recording, piano version)
"Who Is It" (Versions as appear on the "Who Is It" single, plus others)
"Mouth's Cradle" (Cortejo Afro mix, album version)
"Desired Constellation" (Album version)
"Where Is the Line" (Choral recording, album version)
"Pleasure Is All Mine" (Album version)
"Triumph of a Heart" (Album version)
"Ancestors" (Tagaq's vocal recording)
"Miðvikudags" (Album version)
"Submarine" (Piano version - unreleased)
"Komið" ("Come") (Remix - unreleased)
"The Ice Song" (Vocal recording, vocal editing)

References

External links
The Inner or Deep Part of an Animal or Plant Structure page at Bjork.com

Björk video albums
2004 video albums
Documentary films about electronic music and musicians